is a Japanese novelist, active in mystery and various other fields. He was born in 1974, in Hyōgo Prefecture, Japan. He won the 2nd Mephisto Prize in 1996 while in Kyoto University, and started to work as a novelist. After that, Ryusui published over 60 novels. His works are always controversial. The JDC (Japan Detectives Club) series has inspired tribute novels by authors like Ōtarō Maijō and Nisio Isin.

In 2007, he achieved the publication of the series, "What a perfect world!",  for 12 consecutive months. In the same year, he carried out "Doumo tour", the autograph sessions for 12 consecutive months held in Japanese major cities, and made a great success.

On May 1, 2009, he launched "bbbcircle", his official website, with Kai Chamberlain, a Canadian cartoonist.

Style 
His works defy not only the common wisdom of novels but general knowledge in the broad sense  and give new values to readers.
His mystery novels, particularly the JDC series, are known for genre-busting metatexual complexity.

Works in English translation 
 King In the Mirror: The Reflection of Michael Jackson (translated from Japanese by the author himself, The BBB: Breakthrough Bandwagon Books, 2012)

As translator
Seiryoin has been working as a translator from Japanese into English since 2012.

Short mystery stories
Hiroshi Mori
 "The Girl Who Was the Little Bird" (The BBB: Breakthrough Bandwagon Books, 2013)
 "A Pair of Hearts" (The BBB: Breakthrough Bandwagon Books, 2014)
 "I'm In Debt to Akiko" (The BBB: Breakthrough Bandwagon Books, 2014)
 "Silent Prayer In Empty" (The BBB: Breakthrough Bandwagon Books, 2015)
 "Kappa" (The BBB: Breakthrough Bandwagon Books, 2015)
 Kenichi Sobu
 "The Hopeless Dream" (The BBB: Breakthrough Bandwagon Books, 2012)
 "Your Melody" (The BBB: Breakthrough Bandwagon Books, 2014)

The Gifted series by Ryosuke Akizuki
 "The Gifted Vol.3: The Skydiving Club" (The BBB: Breakthrough Bandwagon Books, 2014)
 "The Gifted Vol.4: The Phantom of Gemini" (The BBB: Breakthrough Bandwagon Books, 2015)

Urban Legend Detectives Case series by Kyosuke Tsumiki
 "Urban Legend Detectives Case 1: The Merry's Mail" (The BBB: Breakthrough Bandwagon Books, 2013)
 "Urban Legend Detectives Case 2: Solitary Hide and Seek" (The BBB: Breakthrough Bandwagon Books, 2013)
 "Urban Legend Detectives Case 3: The Kunekune (Dancing White Shadow)" (The BBB: Breakthrough Bandwagon Books, 2014)The Case Diary of Chinami Chiba'' series by Takafumi Takada
 "Three Little Bonzes: The Case Diary of Chinami Chiba" (The BBB: Breakthrough Bandwagon Books, 2014)
a mystery short story combined with the logic puzzle, Knights and Knaves
 "A Goat on a Boat to Float: The Case Diary of Chinami Chiba" (The BBB: Breakthrough Bandwagon Books, 2015)
a mystery short story combined with the river crossing puzzle

Interviews
 Becoming the Best Interviewer In the World: The BBB Interview Selection, interviewee: Yohei Hayakawa (The BBB: Breakthrough Bandwagon Books, 2013)
 Kaiten-sushi Saves the World: The BBB Interview Selection, interviewee: Nobuo Yonekawa (The BBB: Breakthrough Bandwagon Books, 2013)
 Mountaineering, Photographs, and World Heritage Sites: The BBB Interview Selection'', interviewee: Hiroyuki Nakada (The BBB: Breakthrough Bandwagon Books, 2014)

Works

JDC series 
Paperback edition
 Cosmic -Seikimatsu Tantei Shinwa-
 Joker -Kyuyaku Tantei Shinwa-
 Carnival Eve -Jinrui Saidai no Jiken- (December 1997)
 Carnival -Jinrui Saigo no Jiken- (April 1999)
 Carnival Day -Shinjinrui no Kinenbi- (September 1999)
 Saimonke Jiken Zempen -Gokujo Magic Circus- (January 2004)
 Saimonke Jiken Kouhen -Gekokujo Masterpiece- (February 2004)
Pocketbook edition
 Cosmic -Ryu-
 Joker -Sei-
 Joker -Ryo-
 Cosmic -Sui-
The pocketbook edition suggests you read the two volumes of "Joker" between the volumes of "Cosmic"—Sei/Ryo IN Ryu/Sui.
 Carnival -Ichirin no Hana-(January 2003)
 Carnival -Nirin no Kusa- (February 2003)
 Carnival -Sanrin no Sou- (March 2003)
 Carnival -Yonrin no Gyu- (April 2003)
 Carnival -Gorin no Sho- (May 2003)
 Saimonke Jiken I -Kijutsu ga Kitarite Fue wo Fuku- (April 2008)
 Saimonke Jiken II -White and Night- (February 2008)
 Saimonke Jiken III -Saimonke no Ichizoku- (May 2008)
JDC manga
 Exstra Jorker -JOE-
 Exstra Jorker -KER-
 Cosmic Comics -AND-
 Cosmic Comics -END-
JDC tribute books
 Tsukumojuku by Otaro Maijo
 Double Down Kankuro by Ishin Nishio
 Triple Play ScaredCraw by Ishin Nishio
 Tantei Gishiki I by Eiji Otsuka and Chizu Hashii
 Tantei Gishiki II by Eiji Otsuka and Chizu Hashii
 Tantei Gishiki III by Eiji Otsuka and Chizu Hashii
 Tantei Gishiki IV by Eiji Otsuka and Chizu Hashii
 Tantei Gishiki V by Eiji Otsuka and Chizu Hashii

Shoichi Kimura series 
Paperback edition
 19 Box -Shin Mystery Souseki-
 L -Zennihon Janken Tournament-
 U -Nihon Kokumin Zenin Sanka TV Shin Kikaku-
Pocketbook edition
 W(Double) Drive In
 Zennihon Janken Tournament
 Okusenmannin no Ningen CM Scandal

Top Run and Land series 
 Top Run 1: Koko ga Saizensen
 Top Run 2: Koibito ga Yukaihan
 Top Run 3: Minoshirokin Loan
 Top Run 4: Quiz Daigyakuten
 Top Run 5: Saishuuwa ni Sennen
 Top Run Final: Daikoukai wo Run
 Top Land 2001: Tenshi Episode 1
 Top Land 1980: Shinshi Episode 1
 Top Land 2002: Senshi Episode 1
 Top Run and Land Kan

Tokuma series 
 Toku Made Yaru
 Toku Matsu -Yagiritei Jiken-
 Toku Maru

What a Perfect World! series 
Done for Kodansha Box—all twelve volumes in one year.
 What a perfect world! Book.1 ◆One Ace
 What a perfect world! Book.2 ◆Two to Tango
 What a perfect world! Book.3 ◆Three Cheers
 What a perfect world! Book.4 ◆Four Winds
 What a perfect world! Book.5 ◆Five-star
 What a perfect world! Book.6 ◆Sixth Sense
 What a perfect world! Book.7 ◆Seventh Heaven
 What a perfect world! Book.8 ◆Figure of Eight
 What a perfect world! Book.9 ◆On the Cloud Nine
 What a perfect world! Book.10◆Ten Commandments
 What a perfect world! Book.11◆Eleven-plus
 What a perfect world! Book.12◆Perfect Twelve

Others 
 Himitsuya Red
 Himitsuya White
 Himitsuya Bunko Shitteru Kai
including "Himitsuya Red","White" and "Himitsuya Black", newly written.
 Himisshitsu Bon
 Himisshitsu Bon Quiz Show
 Mystereal Chara Net
 Chara Net Ai$tantei no Jikenbo
 Chara Net complete edition Ai$tantei novel
 Burandisshu?
 Seikougaku Chara Kyoju 40million yen tokusuru hanashi
 Redbook -Waltz for Rain-
 Cosmic Zero -Japan Annihilation Plan-
 B/W(Black or White) -The institute for perfect crimes-
 Forgetting Love
 King in the Mirror

References

External links
 Profile at The BBB: Breakthrough Bandwagon Books 
 bbbcircle Ryusui & Kai official website 
 Cosmic Zero special website by Bungeishunju 

1974 births
Living people
20th-century Japanese novelists
21st-century Japanese novelists
Japanese male short story writers
Japanese mystery writers
Japanese translators
Japanese–English translators
People from Nishinomiya
20th-century Japanese short story writers
21st-century Japanese short story writers
20th-century Japanese male writers
21st-century male writers